The Visa-Bikar 2004 was the forty-fifth season of the Icelandic national football cup. It started on May 16, 2004 and concluded with the final on October 2, 2004. The winners qualified for the first qualifying round of the UEFA Cup 2005–06.

Preliminary round

First round

Second round

1The match finished 2-2 a.e.t. with ÍR winning 5-4 on penalties. However, ÍH were awarded the match 3-0 after ÍR fielded an ineligible player.

Third round

Fourth round

Quarterfinals

Semifinals

Final

External links
 RSSSF Page

2004 domestic association football cups
2004 in Icelandic football
2004